Lysak is a surname. Notable people include:
 Anhelina Lysak (born 1998), Ukrainian-Polish wrestler
 Brett Lysak (born 1980), Canadian ice hockey player
 John Lysak (1914–2020), American canoeist
 Steven Lysak (1912–2002), American canoeist

See also